Kuldeep Kumar Srivastava (born 1960) is an Indian poet and author. He has written three volumes of poetry and a literary semi-autobiographical non-fiction. Srivastava is the former Additional Deputy Comptroller and Auditor General in the Office of the Comptroller and Auditor General of India, New Delhi.

Early life and career
Srivastava was born in 1960 in Gorakhpur, Uttar Pradesh. He received his master's degree in economics in 1980 from Gorakhpur University and joined Civil Services in 1983. His first poetry book Ineluctable Stillness came in 2005 followed by two more poetry collections and a semi-autobiographical non-fiction.

Srivastava wrote Soliloquy of a Small-Town Uncivil Servant, a literary non-fiction published in March 2019.

Srivastava is known for his incisive book reviews and articles published in The Pioneer, The Daily Star and Kitaab Singapore.

His poems have been translated into Hindi (Andhere Se Nikli Kavitayen—Nardeo Sharma and Jaswinder Singh) (2017) and his book Shadows of the Real was translated into Russian language by veteran Russian poet Adolf Shvedchikov.

As Principal Accountant General, he headed big offices in States like Kerala, Gujarat, Madhya Pradesh, Bihar and Jharkhand.

Bibliography
Shadow of the Real. Rupa, 2012. 160 pages. .
Shadow of the Real. 2017. 116 pages. Translated into Russian by the Russian poet Adolf Shvedchikov
Ineluctable Stillness (A Collection of Poems). 2005. .
An Armless Hand Writes.
Soliloquy of a Small-Town Uncivil Servant. 2019. 208 pages. .
The Descent: Essays and Critiques (2010–2021), p.182, ASIN:B09QJL23G4

References

External links
Interview with Agron Shele, a poet from Belgium
Interview with Brazilian poet and critic Régis Bonvicino
Interview with Ashok Bhargava, President Writers International Network, Canada
K K Srivastava: In talk with Kurt F Svatek, an Austrian poet

1960 births
Writers from Uttar Pradesh
Hindi-language writers
People from Gorakhpur
Indian satirists
Indian male poets
20th-century Indian male writers
20th-century Indian poets
Living people